Stewart Alexander Parin (born 3 October 1993) is a former Hong Kong professional footballer who played as a centre back. He is of British and Thai descent.

References

External links 
 Stewart, Alexander Parin at HKFA
 

1994 births
Living people
Hong Kong people of English descent
Hong Kong people of Thai descent
Hong Kong footballers
Hong Kong First Division League players
Hong Kong Premier League players
Sun Hei SC players
Association football defenders